DNA mismatch repair protein Msh2 also known as MutS homolog 2 or MSH2 is a protein that in humans is encoded by the MSH2 gene, which is located on chromosome 2. MSH2 is a tumor suppressor gene and more specifically a caretaker gene that codes for a DNA mismatch repair (MMR) protein, MSH2, which forms a heterodimer with MSH6 to make the human MutSα mismatch repair complex. It also dimerizes with MSH3 to form the MutSβ DNA repair complex.  MSH2 is involved in many different forms of DNA repair, including transcription-coupled repair, homologous recombination, and base excision repair.

Mutations in the MSH2 gene are associated with microsatellite instability and some cancers, especially with hereditary nonpolyposis colorectal cancer (HNPCC). At least 114 disease-causing mutations in this gene have been discovered.

Clinical significance 

Hereditary nonpolyposis colorectal cancer (HNPCC), sometimes referred to as Lynch syndrome, is inherited in an autosomal dominant fashion, where inheritance of only one copy of a mutated mismatch repair gene is enough to cause disease phenotype. Mutations in the MSH2 gene account for 40% of genetic alterations associated with this disease and is the leading cause, together with MLH1 mutations. Mutations associated with HNPCC are broadly distributed in all domains of MSH2, and hypothetical functions of these mutations based on the crystal structure of the MutSα include protein–protein interactions, stability, allosteric regulation, MSH2-MSH6 interface, and DNA binding. Mutations in MSH2 and other mismatch repair genes cause DNA damage to go unrepaired, resulting in an increase in mutation frequency. These mutations build up over a person's life that otherwise would not have occurred had the DNA been repaired properly.

Microsatellite instability
The viability of MMR genes including MSH2 can be tracked via microsatellite instability, a biomarker test that analyzes short sequence repeats which are very difficult for cells to replicate without a functioning mismatch repair system. Because these sequences vary in the population, the actual number of copies of short sequence repeats does not matter, just that the number the patient does have is consistent from tissue to tissue and over time. This phenomenon occurs because these sequences are prone to mistakes by the DNA replication complex, which then need to be fixed by the mismatch repair genes. If these are not working, over time either duplications or deletions of these sequences will occur, leading to different numbers of repeats in the same patient.

71% of HNPCC patients show microsatellite instability. Detection methods for microsatellite instability include polymerase chain reaction (PCR) and immunohistochemical (IHC) methods, polymerase chain checking the DNA and immunohistochemical surveying mismatch repair protein levels. "Currently, there are evidences that universal testing for MSI starting with either IHC or PCR-based MSI testing is cost effective, sensitive, specific and is generally widely accepted."

Role in mismatch repair 
In eukaryotes from yeast to humans, MSH2 dimerizes with MSH6 to form the MutSα complex, which is involved in base mismatch repair and short insertion/deletion loops. MSH2 heterodimerization stabilizes MSH6, which is not stable because of its N-terminal disordered domain. Conversely, MSH2 does not have a nuclear localization sequence (NLS), so it is believed that MSH2 and MSH6 dimerize in the cytoplasm and then are imported into the nucleus together. In the MutSα dimer, MSH6 interacts with the DNA for mismatch recognition while MSH2 provides the stability that MSH6 requires. MSH2 can be imported into the nucleus without dimerizing to MSH6, in this case, MSH2 is probably dimerized to MSH3 to form MutSβ. MSH2 has two interacting domains with MSH6 in the MutSα heterodimer, a DNA interacting domain, and an ATPase domain.

The MutSα dimer scans double stranded DNA in the nucleus, looking for mismatched bases. When the complex finds one, it repairs the mutation in an ATP dependent manner. The MSH2 domain of MutSα prefers ADP to ATP, with the MSH6 domain preferring the opposite. Studies have indicated that MutSα only scans DNA with the MSH2 domain harboring ADP, while the MSH6 domain can contain either ADP or ATP. MutSα then associates with MLH1 to repair the damaged DNA.

MutSβ is formed when MSH2 complexes with MSH3 instead of MSH6. This dimer repairs longer insertion/deletion loops than MutSα. Because of the nature of the mutations that this complex repairs, this is probably the state of MSH2 that causes the microsatellite instability phenotype. Large DNA insertions and deletions intrinsically bend the DNA double helix. The MSH2/MSH3 dimer can recognize this topology and initiate repair. The mechanism by which it recognizes mutations is different as well, because it separates the two DNA strands, which MutSα does not.

Interactions
MSH2 has been shown to interact with:
 ATR,
 BRCA1,
 CHEK2,
 EXO1,
 MAX,
 MSH3,
 MSH6, and
 p53.

Epigenetic MSH2 deficiencies in cancer

DNA damage appears to be the primary underlying cause of cancer, and deficiencies in expression of DNA repair genes appear to underlie many forms of cancer.  If DNA repair is deficient, DNA damage tends to accumulate. Such excess DNA damage may increase mutations due to error-prone translesion synthesis and error prone repair (see e.g. microhomology-mediated end joining). Elevated DNA damage may also increase epigenetic alterations due to errors during DNA repair. Such mutations and epigenetic alterations may give rise to cancer.

Reductions in expression of DNA repair genes (usually caused by epigenetic alterations) are very common in cancers, and are ordinarily much more frequent than mutational defects in DNA repair genes in cancers. (See Frequencies of epimutations in DNA repair genes.)  In a study of MSH2 in non-small cell lung cancer (NSCLC), no mutations were found while 29% of NSCLC had epigenetic reduction of MSH2 expression.  In acute lymphoblastoid leukemia (ALL), no MSH2 mutations were found while 43% of ALL patients showed MSH2 promoter methylation and 86% of relapsed ALL patients had MSH2 promoter methylation.  There were, however, mutations in four other genes in ALL patients that destabilized the MSH2 protein, and these were defective in 11% of children with ALL and 16% of adults with this cancer.

Methylation of the promoter region of the MSH2 gene is correlated with the lack of expression of the MSH2 protein in esophageal cancer,  in non-small-cell lung cancer,  and in colorectal cancer.  These correlations suggest that methylation of the promoter region of the MSH2 gene reduces expression of the MSH2 protein.  Such promoter methylation would reduce DNA repair in the four pathways in which MSH2 participates: DNA mismatch repair, transcription-coupled repair homologous recombination, and base excision repair.   Such reductions in repair likely allow excess DNA damage to accumulate and contribute to carcinogenesis.

The frequencies of MSH2 promoter methylation in several different cancers are indicated in the Table.

See also
 Mismatch repair#MutS homologs

References

Further reading

External links